Ian Roger Gilzean (born 10 December 1969) is a Scottish former professional footballer who played as a striker. Active in England, Scotland, and Ireland, Gilzean made over 250 career appearances, scoring nearly 100 goals. He is the son of Scottish international player Alan Gilzean.

Career
Born in Enfield, England, Gilzean began his career with the youth team of English team Tottenham Hotspur, before making his professional debut with Scottish team Dundee. Later on in his career, Gilzean played in England for Doncaster Rovers and Northampton Town, in Scotland for Ayr United, Elgin City and Montrose, and in Ireland for Sligo Rovers, Drogheda United, St Patrick's Athletic and in Northern Ireland for Glentoran.

Gilzean signed for Sligo Rovers on a three-year deal in July 1995 and scored on his League of Ireland debut on the opening day of the 1995–96 League of Ireland season. In September 1997 he joined Drogheda United but after only 4 appearances he moved to St Patrick's Athletic, where he scored a hat trick on his debut at Sligo Rovers.

He played twice against Celtic in the 1998–99 UEFA Champions League qualifying round. Days after the disappointment of losing to Celtic St Pats were involved in a 4 team tournament at Lansdowne Road. The Carlsberg Trophy pitted them against Liverpool and Lazio where Gilzean scored a consolation goal as a tired St Pats lost 4–1.

In October 1999, Gilzean moved to Glentoran. Gilzean scored the winning goal in the 2000 Irish Cup Final.

References

External links

1969 births
Living people
Scottish footballers
Tottenham Hotspur F.C. players
Dundee F.C. players
Doncaster Rovers F.C. players
Northampton Town F.C. players
Ayr United F.C. players
Sligo Rovers F.C. players
Drogheda United F.C. players
St Patrick's Athletic F.C. players
Glentoran F.C. players
Shelbourne F.C. players
Elgin City F.C. players
Montrose F.C. players
Scottish Football League players
English Football League players
Scottish football managers
Carnoustie Panmure F.C. managers
Association football forwards
League of Ireland players
NIFL Premiership players
Expatriate association footballers in the Republic of Ireland
Anglo-Scots